Ole Avei (born 13 June 1983 in Wellington, New Zealand) is a Samoan International Rugby Union player, currently playing hooker with Soyaux-Angouleme in the French Pro D2.

Avei began his professional career in 2005 with the Queensland Reds, making his first Super 14 debut in 2006, against the Chiefs in Hamilton. He then went on to play for Waikato in the Air New Zealand Cup in 2008, and in 2010, he signed in France with the Union Bordeaux Bègles for 2 years, extending his contract for a rare 5-year deal over offers from several top clubs, including current champions Stade Toulousain (Toulouse).

Avei made his International debut for Samoa in the 2011 Pacific Nations Cup, in the match against Japan on 2 July 2011. He was then selected to represent Samoa in the 2011 Rugby World Cup in New Zealand and the 2015 Rugby World Cup.

Avei married his longtime girlfriend of over 8 years, Angelina, on 29 June 2013 in Australia.  Their daughter Siena Eva Avei was born on 13 April 2014.

Clubs
 2005–08: Queensland Reds (Super 14)
 2008–10: Waikato (NPC), Chiefs (WTG)
 2010- Nov 2017: Union Bordeaux Begles (Pro D2 and Top 14)
 Dec 2017- 2019: Racing 92 (Top 14)
 2019- : Soyaux Angoulême XV Charente (Pro D2)

References

External links
 UBB Official Website
 Ole Avei et la première ligne de l'UBB au charbon 
 L'incroyable prolongation d'Avei à Bordeaux ! 
 Ole ! Avei déboule
 Avei, le symbole

1983 births
Samoan rugby union players
New Zealand sportspeople of Samoan descent
Queensland Reds players
Waikato rugby union players
Samoa international rugby union players
Rugby union hookers
New Zealand expatriate rugby union players
Expatriate rugby union players in France
Expatriate rugby union players in Australia
New Zealand expatriate sportspeople in Australia
New Zealand expatriate sportspeople in France
Samoan expatriate rugby union players
Samoan expatriate sportspeople in France
Samoan expatriate sportspeople in Australia
Union Bordeaux Bègles players
Rugby union players from Wellington City
Living people
People educated at the Southport School
Racing 92 players
Soyaux Angoulême XV Charente players